Keçiliqaya (also, Kechilikaya, Kechili, and Kechilli) is a village in the Kalbajar Rayon of Azerbaijan.

References 

Populated places in Kalbajar District